Mallemala Shyam Prasad Reddy is an Indian film producer in the Telugu film industry. He won three Nandi Awards. He made his debut, as a  producer film, with Thalambralu, in 1987. His father, M. S. Reddy, was a film writer and film producer. He produced immensely successful films like Ammoru and Arundhati.

Filmography

References

External links
 

Living people
Telugu film producers
Year of birth missing (living people)
Film producers from Andhra Pradesh
Indian film producers
Indian television producers